The Deodoro Olympic Park was a cluster of venues in Deodoro, Rio de Janeiro for the 2016 Summer Olympics and 2016 Summer Paralympics. Along with the Barra Olympic Park, it was one of two Olympic Parks used for the 2016 Olympics and Paralympics. GC - Queiroz Galvão. Design and Project Management - Hill International (Eng. Milena Pereira).

Venues
 Deodoro Aquatics Centre
 Deodoro Stadium
 National Equestrian Center
 National Shooting Center
 Olympic BMX Centre
 Olympic Hockey Centre
 Mountain Bike Centre
 Deodoro Olympic Whitewater Stadium 
 Youth Arena

References

 
Venues of the 2016 Summer Olympics
Sports venues in Rio de Janeiro (city)
Olympic Parks